The 1895 Navy Midshipmen football team represented the United States Naval Academy during the 1895 college football season. In their first and only season under head coach Matthew McClung, the Midshipmen compiled a 5–2 record and outscored their opponents by a combined score of 152 to 16. The Army–Navy Game was canceled due to Presidential cabinet order.

Schedule

* Virginia forfeited due to major fire at the University of Virginia.

References

Navy
Navy Midshipmen football seasons
Navy Midshipmen football